"Blue Champagne" is a song written by Grady Watts, Jimmy Eaton and Frank L. Ryerson and recorded by American bandleader Jimmy Dorsey, featuring vocals by singer Bob Eberly.

Background
It was first released by Jimmy Dorsey on Decca Records in 1941, backed with "All Alone and Lonely". It topped The Billboard's National Best Selling Retail Records chart on the week of September 27, 1941, becoming Dorsey's fifth number-one single of that year.

Other recordings
Other recordings included those by Xavier Cugat, Ray Eberle, Freddy Martin, Anita O'Day, and Tex Beneke. Glenn Miller also performed the song with his orchestra and released a version on V-Disc as 144B with the Army Air Force Training Command Orchestra.

References

Sources
Stockdale, Robert L. Jimmy Dorsey: A Study in Contrasts. (Studies in Jazz Series). Lanham, MD: The Scarecrow Press, Inc., 1999.

External links
Blue Champagne by Jimmy Dorsey. Discogs.

1941 songs
1941 singles
Jimmy Dorsey songs
Number-one singles in the United States
Decca Records singles